The Shire of Corangamite is a local government area in the Barwon South West region of Victoria, Australia, located in the south-western part of the state. It includes the towns of Camperdown, Terang, Cobden, Timboon, Port Campbell and Skipton. It was formed in 1994 from the amalgamation of the Town of Camperdown, Shire of Hampden, Shire of Heytesbury, and parts of the Shire of Otway, Shire of Mortlake and Shire of Warrnambool.

The Shire is governed and administered by the Corangamite Shire Council; its seat of local government and administrative centre is located at the council headquarters in Camperdown. The Shire is named after the major geographical feature in the region, Lake Corangamite, which is located on the eastern boundary of the LGA.

It came into existence on 23 September 1994 through the amalgamation of the local government areas of Camperdown Town, Hampden Shire (part), Heytesbury Shire (part), Mortlake Shire (part), Otway Shire (part) & Warrnambool Shire (part).

Council

Current composition
The council is composed of five wards and seven councillors, with three councillors elected to represent the Central Ward and one councillor per remaining ward elected to represent each of the other wards.

Administration and governance
The Council meets at the Killara Centre in Camperdown while its main Council offices are located at 181 Manifold Street.

Townships and localities
The 2021 census, the shire had a population of 16,115 up from 16,051 in the 2016 census

^ - Territory divided with another LGA
* - Not noted in 2016 Census
# - Not noted in 2021 Census

See also
 List of localities in Victoria (Australia)

References

External links

Corangamite Shire Council official website
Metlink local public transport map
Link to Land Victoria interactive maps

Local government areas of Victoria (Australia)
Barwon South West (region)